2017 Gainare Tottori season.

Competitions

J. League

Emperor's Cup
Lost to Kagoshima United in the 1st round.

League table

J3 League

References

External links
 J.League official site

Gainare Tottori
Gainare Tottori seasons